The 1983 European Ladies' Team Championship took place 22–26 June at the Royal Waterloo Golf Club in Lasne, Belgium. It was the 13th women's golf amateur European Ladies' Team Championship.

Venue 
The hosting club was founded in 1923 by Rodolphe Seeldrayers. The course was designed by architect Frederick William Hawtree  and established in 1961 in Ohain, Lasne, in the region of Wallon Brabant, close to the historic Waterloo battlefield, 20 kilometres south-east of the city center of Brussels, Belgium.

The championship course was set up with par 73.

Format 
All participating teams played two qualification rounds of stroke-play with six players, counted the five best scores for each team.

The eight best teams formed flight A, in knock-out match-play over the next three days. The teams were seeded based on their positions after the stroke-play. The first placed team was drawn to play the quarter final against the eight placed team, the second against the seventh, the third against the sixth and the fourth against the fifth. In each match between two nation teams, two 18-hole foursome games and five 18-hole single games were played. Teams were allowed to switch players during the team matches, selecting other players in to the afternoon single games after the morning foursome games. Games all square after 18 holes were declared halved, if the team match was already decided.

The four teams placed 9–12 in the qualification stroke-play formed Flight B and the four teams placed 13–16 formed flight C, to play similar knock-out play to decide their final positions.

Teams 
A record number of 16 nation teams contested the event. Finland and Iceland took part for the first time. Each team consisted of six players.

Players in the leading teams

Other participating teams

Winners 
West Germany and Spain tied the lead at the opening 36-hole qualifying competition, with a score of 34 over par 764, with West Germany winning by the tie-breaking better total non-counting scores. 

Tied individual leaders in the 36-hole stroke-play competition was Claire Hourihane, Ireland, and 17-year-old Liselotte Neumann, Sweden, each with a score of 1-over-par 147, one stroke ahead of Gillian Stewart, Scotland.  Hourihane scored a new course record of 4 under par 69 in the first round.

Ireland, a combined team from the Republic of Ireland and Northern Ireland, won the gold, earning their second title in the last three championships, beating team England in the final 5–1. Defending champions Sweden earned third place, beating West Germany 5–2 in the bronze match.

Results 
Qualification round

Team standings

* Note: In the event of a tie the order was determined by the better total non-counting scores.

Individual leaders

 Note: There was no official award for the lowest individual score.

Flight A

Bracket

Final games

* Note: Game declared halved, since team match already decided.

Flight B

Flight C

Final standings

Sources:

See also 
 Espirito Santo Trophy – biennial world amateur team golf championship for women organized by the International Golf Federation.
 European Amateur Team Championship – European amateur team golf championship for men organised by the European Golf Association.

References

External links 
 European Golf Association: Results

European Ladies' Team Championship
Golf tournaments in Belgium
European Ladies' Team Championship
European Ladies' Team Championship
European Ladies' Team Championship